Uggiano la Chiesa is a town and comune in the province of Lecce in the Apulia region of south-east Italy.

Main sights
Mother Church, finished in 1775.
Tower of the Angel
Crypt of St. Helena, a Byzantine church with remains of the original frescoes.
Crypt of Archangel Michael, dating to the 13th-14th centuries.

Twin towns
 Atrani, Italy, since July 2006

References

Cities and towns in Apulia
Localities of Salento